Logol, or Lukha, is a Niger–Congo language in the Heiban family spoken in the Nuba Mountains  of Kordofan, Sudan.

References

Heiban languages
Severely endangered languages